Chunking is a method of presenting information which splits concepts into small pieces or "chunks" of information to make reading and understanding faster and easier. Chunking is especially useful for material presented on the web because readers tend to scan for specific information on a web page rather than read the page sequentially.

Chunked content usually contains:
 bulleted lists
 short sub-headings
 short sentences with one or two ideas per sentence
 short paragraphs, even one-sentence paragraphs
 easily scannable text, with bolding of key phrases
 inline graphics to guide the eyes or illustrate points which would normally require more words

Advantages of chunking
 Chunking helps technical communicators or marketers convey information more efficiently
 Chunking helps readers find what they are looking for quickly
 Chunking allows material to be presented consistently from page to page, so users can apply previous knowledge of page layout and navigation and focus on the content rather than the presentation

The bite, snack and meal is a popular phrase for a specific means of chunking content.

Disadvantages of chunking

See also 

 Chunking (psychology)

References

 "Chunking the Content" - Writing for the Web: Guidelines for MIT Libraries accessed January 16, 2015
 "Organizing Your Information" - Web Style Guide accessed January 16, 2015

Writing